Océane Zhu Xuan (born on April 4, 1987) is a Chinese model, former beauty queen, and actress based in Hong Kong. She joined TVB in 2009 and left in 2015 to explore a career in China.

Life and career

Early life
Océane was born and raised in Beijing. Growing up, she had been interested in the performing arts and longed to study it in France. Both her parents are in the Chinese Army and at seventeen, her parents gave her the option of either joining the military or study abroad; she chose to pursue her dreams. She eventually moved to Paris and studied acting at Cours Florent (a private French drama school) to hone her craft and graduated in 2010, making her fluent in Mandarin and French.

2008 Miss China Europe and Miss China International
While studying in Paris, she was a part-time model and learned about the Miss China Europe 2008 pageant when a reporter asked her about it. Feeling she had nothing to lose, she attended and won the competition. Afterwards, she represented Paris in the Miss China International 2008 pageant in Hong Kong and also won. Like all beauty pageant winners in HK, Océane was offered a contract to act in TVB and began her acting career.

Joining TVB and 2009 debut
While Océane joined TVB in 2009, she wouldn't make an official appearance in HK until 2010 in the drama  Some Day. Usually the pageant winner is untrained in acting and go through acting school before making their debut, Océane was already trained and still went through the acting courses to refine her acting and speak Cantonese. However, she made her acting debut in the 2009 Taiwanese historical drama (later remade into a movie): the Prince of Tears. Océane would work in TVB for the next seven years. During her time with TVB though, Océane never had lead roles and only played support roles due to her limited fluency in Cantonese.

2015 TVB departure and 2018 marriage
By around October 2015, Océane declared she was leaving TVB. Her contract was expiring and she decided not to renew; she decided to explore her career within China. She would venture into film, featured in 2016's  Line Walker and 2017's The Bittersweet. By September 2018, she privately got married in Belgium to a second generation rich man from Mainland China. As of 2020, Océane has yet to return in any dramas nor films.

Filmography

Film

Television dramas

References

External links
 Océane's official TVB Blog
 Zhu's information at Hudong.com
 Océane Zhu's Instagram

1987 births
Living people
Chinese emigrants to France
Hong Kong film actresses
French expatriates in Hong Kong
Hong Kong television actresses
Miss Chinese International winners
TVB actors
21st-century Chinese actresses
Actresses from Beijing
Chinese film actresses
Chinese television actresses
21st-century Hong Kong actresses